Virtus Segafredo Arena, simply known for sponsorship reasons as Segafredo Arena, is a temporary indoor arena located in Bologna, with a capacity of 9,980 seats, one of the largest of the country. The arena was opened in November 2019 and hosted some home games of Virtus Bologna. From November 2019 to June 2021, it was initially located in the "Padiglione 30", a fair pavilion within the Fiera District, but in November 2021, it was moved to "Padiglione 37".

History
The arena was inaugurated on 10 November 2019, for the home game against Treviso Basket, won by Virtus 84–79. On 25 December, for the derby against Fortitudo Bologna, 9,166 fans attended the game, achieving a new record for Virtus in LBA.

In January 2020, the arena was dismantled and rebuilt in September, to host the Final Four of the 2020 Italian Basketball Supercup. Moreover, the arena became the official home court of Virtus for the 2020–21 season of LBA and EuroCup.

In April 2021, Massimo Zanetti, owner of Virtus and Segafredo, announced that the team will remain to the Segafredo Arena for at least three more seasons, with the hope of starting to build a new arena in 2022.

On 11 June 2021, at the Segafredo Arena, Virtus defeated its historic rival Olimpia Milano in the national finals, winning its 16th national title and the first one after twenty years.

In November 2021, the arena was moved to another fair pavilion with a capacity of 9,980 seats and was inaugurated on 17 November for a EuroCup match against Reyer Venezia. On 11 May 2022, the arena hosted the EuroCup Final between Virtus and Frutti Extra Bursaspor, won by Virtus 80–67. The game set a new record for the club with 718,279 euro of revenue and almost 10,000 attendance.

Gallery

See also
 List of indoor arenas in Italy

References

External links

 

Sports venues in Bologna
Basketball venues in Italy
Indoor arenas in Italy
2019 establishments in Italy
Basketball in Emilia-Romagna